Indian School, Ras Al- Khaimah is an English-medium  school situated in Nakheel, Ras al-Khaimah. Founded in 1979 it  is  managed  by  the  Indian  Association. The school is recognised by the Ministry of Education of the United Arab Emirates and affiliated with the Central Board of Secondary Education (CBSE) in New Delhi. It has adopted the same syllabus as the Central Schools Organization and prepares students for the All India Secondary School Examination and Senior School Certificate Examination of the CBSE, New Delhi (India).

Classes 
The school offers classes from Lower Kindergarten (LKG) to the 12th grade. The school offers a computer lab and science labs as well as a library.

Uniform
Boys
 LKG  and  UKG regular uniform is white  sh, navy blue shorts, school  ID card, black shoes  and  white  socks. Navy blue cardigan  during  winter
 PT uniform is white  shirt,  white  shorts and white  shoes. White  cardigan  during  winter.
Boys
 STD  I  to  XII regular uniform is white  shirt (full sleeves for 8th and above), navy blue tie, navy blue trousers, school ID card, black shoes  and  white  socks. Navy blue sweater  during  winter.
 PT uniform is white shirt, white  pants, white  canvas  shoes and  white  socks. White  sweater  during  winter.

Girls: 
 LKG  to  STD III regular uniform is white  shirt, navy blue tie, navy blue pinafore and school ID card, black  shoes and white  socks. Navy blue cardigan during  winter.
 PT uniform is white shirt, white pinafore, white shoes and white socks. White  cardigan during  winter. 	 
Girls
 STD  I  to  XII regular uniform is white shirt (full sleeves for 8th and above), navy blue tie, navy blue pinafore, white Pajama, school ID card, black shoes and white socks. Navy blue cardigan during  winter.
 PT uniform is white shirt, white pinafore, white pajama, white canvas shoes and white socks. White  cardigan  during  winter. 
	 
Note: STD VIII to XII - white shirt with full sleeves.

External links
 Indian School-Ras Al Khaimah

Educational institutions established in 1979
Indian international schools in the United Arab Emirates
1979 establishments in the United Arab Emirates
Schools in the Emirate of Ras Al Khaimah